Anna of Hesse (26 October 1529, Kassel – 10 July 1591, Meisenheim) was a princess of Hesse by birth and marriage Countess Palatine of Zweibrücken.

Early life 
Anna was a daughter of Landgrave Philip I of Hesse (1501–1567) from his marriage to Princess Christine of Saxony (1505–1549), a daughter of Duke George of Saxony.

Biography 
She married on 24 February 1544 with Count Palatine Wolfgang of Zweibrücken (1526–1569). After the death of her husband, Anna and her brother William and Elector Palatine Louis VI jointly acted as guardians for her children. William was also the executor of Wolfgang's testament.

Around 1590, Anna founded the St. Anne's churchyard in Heidelberg. In 1596, a stone monument in her honor was erected in this churchyard. When the churchyard was closed in 1845, the monument was moved to the Bergfriedhof churchyard.

Anna died in 1591 and was buried in the Lutheran Church of Meisenheim Castle.

Issue 
From her marriage, Anna had the following children:
 Christine (1546–1619)
 Philip Louis (1547–1614), Count Palatine of Palatinate-Neuburg
married in 1574 princess Anna of Cleves (1552–1632)
 John I (1550–1604), Count Palatine of Palatinate-Zweibrücken
 married in 1579 princess Magdalene of Jülich-Cleves-Berg (1553–1633)
 Dorothy Agnes (1551–1552)
 Elizabeth (1553–1554)
 Anna (1554–1576)
 Elizabeth (1555–1625)
 Otto Henry (1556–1604), Count Palatine of Palatinate-Sulzbach
 married in 1582 duchess Marie Dorothea of Württemberg (1559–1639)
 Frederick (1557–1597), Count Palatine of Palatinate-Zweibrücken-Vohenstrauss-Parkstein
 married in 1587 duchess Catherine Sophie of Legnica (1561–1608)
 Barbara (1559–1618)
 married in 1591 Count Gottfried of Oettingen-Oettingen (1554–1622)
 Charles I (1560–1600), Count Palatine of Palatinate-Zweibrücken-Birkenfeld
 married in 1586 duchess Maria Dorothea of Brunswick-Lüneburg (1570–1649)
 Maria Elisabeth (1561–1629)
 married in 1585 Count Emich XII of Leiningen-Dagsburg-Hardenburg (1562–1607)
 Susanna (1564–1565)

Ancestors

References 
 Friedrich Rehm: Handbuch der Geschichte beider Hessen p. 82
 Christoph von Rommel: Geschichte von Hessen p. 609 ff

External links 
 http://www.s197410804.online.de/Wittelsbacher/Anna.htm

House of Hesse
House of Wittelsbach
1529 births
1591 deaths
16th-century German people
Countesses Palatine of Zweibrücken
Landgravines of Hesse-Kassel
Daughters of monarchs